The Hungarian Cooperative and Agrarian Party (MSZAP), was a short-lived agrarianist political party in Hungary.

The party contested the 1990 parliamentary election, it had individual candidates and a regional list only in Heves County, receiving 0.1 percent of the votes and won no seats. The party nominated Minister of Justice Kálmán Kulcsár as their candidate for the position of President of Hungary. After that the MSZAP did not participate in any further elections, it merged into the Agrarian Alliance (ASZ) on 19 December 1992.

Election results

National Assembly

References

Sources

1989 establishments in Hungary
1992 disestablishments in Hungary
Agrarian parties in Hungary
Defunct political parties in Hungary
Political parties disestablished in 1992
Political parties established in 1989